The 1908 Liège–Bastogne–Liège was the fourth edition of the Liège–Bastogne–Liège cycle race and was held on 30 August 1908. The race started and finished in Liège. The race was won by André Trousselier.

General classification

References

1908
1908 in Belgian sport
1908 in road cycling